Chen Yongfeng (1983 – April 7, 2004), known as The Butcher, was a Chinese serial killer who operated in the Wenzhou area in early 2003. Before his capture, Chen killed and dismembered 10 people, all of them were scrap merchants whom he invited into his home.

Biography

Early life 
The exact date of birth isn't clear, but Chen was born sometime in 1983 in Qingtian County, Zhejiang. He left school after graduating from elementary school, afterwards started to shuffle around odd jobs, including  fluffing cotton for nearly half a decade. However by the age of 19, he appeared to have found work as a garbage collector.

Murders 
Beginning on February 24, 2003 Chen began his killing spree. His first murder occurred when he wanted to buy a disinfection cabinet but had not enough cash. He would find his victims at trash collecting sites he frequently visited for work, and invite them to his home where he would kill them, succeeding this he robbed their corpses of money and jewelry, then dismembered them and discarded the subsequent remains in a river. He was arrested on May 24, after being caught in the act of dismembering his tenth victim and final murder victim. In a subsequent house search, police found that Chen had stolen a total of 10,032 yuan.

Trial 
The trial of Chen Yongfeng was opened by the Wenzhou Intermediate People’s Court later that year, with him half admitting his guilt. At the same time, there was a civil trial for Chen, was being told to pay the funeral expenses to the relatives of his victims. In the end, the verdict was guilty, and Chen was sentenced to death on December 5, 2003. On April 7 of the following year, Chen was executed.

See also 
 List of serial killers by country
 List of serial killers by number of victims

References 

1983 births
2004 deaths
21st-century Chinese criminals
Chinese male criminals
Executed Chinese serial killers
Male serial killers
People convicted of murder by China
People from Qingtian County